Sue Vinton (born November 26, 1956) is an American politician who has served in the Montana House of Representatives from the 56th district since 2017.

Career 
Vinton started her career as a litigation paralegal. Vinton is a business owner and a general contractor in Montana.

On November 8, 2016, Vinton won the election and became a Republican member of Montana House of Representatives for District 56. On November 6, 2018, as an incumbent, Vinton won the election and continued serving as the Montana House of Representatives for District 56. On November 3, 2020, as an incumbent, Vinton won the election and continued serving as the Montana House of Representatives for District 56.

Personal life 
Vinton's husband is Mike Vinton. They have four children. Vinton and her family live in Lockwood, Montana.

References

External links 
 Sue Vinton at meic.org
 Sue Vinton at ballotpedia.org
 Sue Vinton at ourcampaigns.com

1956 births
21st-century American politicians
21st-century American women politicians
Alfred University alumni
Living people
Republican Party members of the Montana House of Representatives
Women state legislators in Montana